Vaitkevičius is a Lithuanian language family name corresponding to the Polish surname Wojtkiewicz.  It may refer to:

Irena Vaitkevičienė,  Lithuanian rower
Daiva Vaitkevičienė-Astramskaitė, Lithuanian folklorist
Ričardas Vaitkevičius (1933 – 1996), Lithuanian rower
Vykintas Vaitkevičius, Lithuanian archaeologist
Vainutis Vaitkevičius, (1927-2017), Lithuanian-American Cancer Specialist and Innovator

Lithuanian-language surnames

lt:Vaitkevičius